Moravske Toplice (known until 1983 as Moravci) is a settlement in the Municipality of Moravske Toplice in the Prekmurje region of Slovenia. It is the seat of the municipality. It is best known as for its spa.

Name
The name of the settlement was changed from Moravci to Moravske Toplice in 1983.

Spas
There are two spas located in the Moravske Toplice. The vast grassy surfaces surrounding the pools and offers natural shade.

The smaller one is Terme Vivat spa. Vivat hotel is fully adapted for persons with disabilities and is the first hotel in Slovenia, which is designed for people with hearing impairment.

Church

The Lutheran church in Moravske Toplice stands at the site of a former manor that was remodeled for religious use. The bell tower was built in 1925, and the nave was built in 1962 after the manor was razed.

References

External links 

Moravske Toplice on Geopedia

Populated places in the Municipality of Moravske Toplice
Spa towns in Slovenia